Yeylaq Marshun (also Romanized as Yeylāq Marshūn; also known as Marchīn, Marchon, Marchūn, Margun, and Marshūn) is a village in Howmeh Rural District, in the Central District of Abhar County, Zanjan Province, Iran. At the 2006 census, its population was 432, in 77 families.

References 

Populated places in Abhar County